The East Timor Supreme Court of Justice, also known as the Court of Appeal of East Timor, is the highest court of East Timor. Established by the Constitution of East Timor with ultimate jurisdiction over all legal, constitutional and electoral matters (§ 124 Art. 1 and 2 of the Constitution). 

The seat of the court is in the Borohun district (Suco Caicoli) on Rua de Caicoli, west of the Municipal Market of Dili.

History

The United Nations Transitional Administration in East Timor (UNTAET) established a transitional judicial court service in 2000, consisting of a small number of Timorese judges, prosecutors, and public defenders. On January 7, 2000, the first group of judges took their seats. 

With the restoration of East Timor's independence on 20 May 2002, the Constitution became valid, which in § 124 calls for the creation of a Supreme Court. Its function and composition are regulated in § 125. Depending on the legal provisions, it can act as the first or second or only instance. It is composed of professional judges, magistrates of the ministry and jurists of merit. One judge is appointed by the National Parliament, the others by the Superior Council for Judicial Magistrates. The President of the Court is appointed by the President of East Timor from among the judges of the Court of Appeal.  

Meanwhile 21 June 2007, East Timor witnessed the swearing-in of the first group of twenty-seven national judges, prosecutors, and public defenders, graduates of the legal training center in Caicoli, as well as permanent agents of sovereign bodies and a special representative of the UN Secretary General. First, the Coordination Council oversaw the UNDP Justice Strengthening Programme's implementation, which trained public defenders and national judicial groups (which included the Minister of Justice, the President of the Court of Appeal and the Public Prosecutor-General). The Program had the support of the Governments of Australia, Brazil, United States of America, Ireland, Norway, Portugal and Sweden. 

§ Section 126 of the Constitution defines the competences of the court. It deals with all legal constitutional questions, checks for unconstitutional conduct by legal and administrative organs of the state and the constitutionality of ordinances, laws and referendums. Likewise, the court examines for unconstitutionality by omission or the unconstitutional rulings of lower instances.

In addition, there is the constitutional and legal examination of the legality of the formation, registration or dissolution of political parties and their coalitions. In presidential elections, the Supreme Court examines the legal requirements for candidates and, in all elections, the conformity of the actions in the electoral process with the valid law. Finally, the Court examines the election results and officially announces them.

Court composition
Article 125 of the Constitution states that the Supreme Court shall consist of career judges or magistrates of the Public Prosecution or jurists of recognized merit. The number of members is determined by law. There shall be one judge elected by the National Parliament, and the others shall be appointed by the Higher Council of the Judiciary. All judges must be Timorese.

Presidents 
The term of office of the President of the Court is four years and can be extended.

Other judges 

 Maria Natércia Gusmão Pereira
 Jacinta Correia da Costa, Since 2003
 Duarte Tilman Soares
 António José Fonseca de Jesus

Former judges 
To support the development of East Timor's judicial system, judges from other countries were also appointed until 2014.
Cláudio de Jesus Ximenes (2003 – 2014)
Guilhermino da Silva (2014 – 2017)
Frederick Egonda-Ntende (from Uganda)
José Luís da Góia (From Portugal)
Cid Orlando Geraldo (From Portugal)
José Maria Calvário Antunes (From Portugal), June 2003 – ?

References

Society of East Timor